Andrew O'Shaughnessy (28 July 1866 – 1956) was an Irish politician and industrialist.

Business
O'Shaughnessy started his career with the opening of a creamery in Newmarket in 1895. He then added other creameries in County Cork and County Tipperary to build the Newmarket Dairy Company which eventually had twenty four branches.

In 1903 he purchased Dripsey Woollen Mills from Charles Olden. In the following years he added Kilkenny Woolen mills, Sallybrook Woollen Mills, Bridgetown Flour mills and Dock Milling Company, Dublin to his ownership, thus establishing himself as one of the leading woollen  manufacturers in Ireland. His publishing interests included a stake in Standard Press Ltd and Juverna Press Ltd, Dublin. During this time he also built about 70 cottages for the mill workers in what is now known as the Model Village in Dripsey. Newspaper reports from the time comment on the quality of Dripsey tweed and drapery of which 90 per cent was for export to Paris, London, Asia and Canada. After his death in 1956, Dripsey Woollen Mills remained in the family and went on to win 8 Gold Medals at the Sacramento fair in the 1960s. The mills eventually closed in the 1980s.

Politics
He was elected to Dáil Éireann as a Teachta Dála (TD) for the Cork Borough constituency at the 1923 general election. In June 1924 the Minister for External Affairs, Desmond FitzGerald, appointed O'Shaughnessy as representative from Ireland at the International Labour Conference at Geneva. His party label, "Cork Progressive Association", was a name used by the Business and Professional Group, a loose association of businessmen formed during the Third Dáil. He did not contest the June 1927 general election.

Later life
O'Shaughnessy restored a number of residences of character in Cork, and over his life lived in over sixteen different properties. Among the residences he lived in were St Raphael's house, Montenotte; Windsor in Rochestown (now Rochestown Park Hotel) and Dripsey Castle (formerly the home of the Bowen-Colthurst family, and sold by members of the O'Shaughnessy family in 2015).

References

1866 births
1956 deaths
Independent TDs
Members of the 4th Dáil
Politicians from County Cork
Business and Professional Group TDs